Si Da Ming Cong is a collective term referring to four famous Wuyi oolong tea bush varieties and the tea beverages made from them, namely:

 Da Hong Pao ('Big Red Robe')
 Shui Jin Gui ('Golden Water Turtle')
 Tie Luo Han ('Iron Arhat')
 Bai Ji Guan ('White Cockscomb')

References

Oolong tea
Wuyi tea